is a former Japanese basketball player.

References

1973 births
Living people
Akita Isuzu/Isuzu Motors Lynx/Giga Cats players
Japanese men's basketball players
People from Yokosuka, Kanagawa
1998 FIBA World Championship players
Universiade medalists in basketball
Universiade silver medalists for Japan
Medalists at the 1995 Summer Universiade